Wilhelmus "Wim" Roetert (22 January 1892 – 29 April 1969) was a Dutch footballer who played for Go Ahead Deventer. He featured once for the Netherlands national football team in 1923, scoring two goals.

Career statistics

International

International goals
Scores and results list the Netherlands' goal tally first.

References

1892 births
1969 deaths
Dutch footballers
Netherlands international footballers
Association football forwards
Go Ahead Eagles players